Garage Club is a French computer-animated cel-shaded television series aired on Nickelodeon (France) since September 2009 and on France 4 since September 2011.

Concept 
An abandoned locale serves as the center stage for the adventures and soul-searching of a teen rock band. However, the neighbours, who have been driven around the bend by their music, devise all sorts of incredible schemes to keep them from rehearsing.

The series develops two aspects at the same time:
 a "sitcom" aspect, featuring the band members’ trials and tribulations as teenagers, as well as their arguments over music in general and their rehearsals in particular;
 a "cartoon" aspect, featuring the various ploys the neighbors concoct to prevent the band from playing.

Each episode systematically ends with the failure of the neighbours’ plan and the launch of a new rehearsal, with the band members totally unaware of what they managed to avoid.

Season 1 
 Love story
 Never Spike without Nick
 "We're splitting !"
 Shock wave
 Big in Japan
 A very trendy concert
 Rage against the fur
 Zoomusicology
 Killer face
 Valentine's troubles
 No logo
 Edward Scissorvoice
 Anatomical Mushrooms
 Zombie rock
 Mighty Edward
 Dumb and drummer
 Megalo rock
 Bioband
 Love at first sight
 Game over
 LOL
 Drum sticks
 Momo's tomtom
 Fan fun fool
 Apocalypsound
 Punk food

External links 
 Garage Club on France 4
 Garage Club on Nickelodeon (France)
 

2000s French animated television series
2010s French animated television series
2009 French television series debuts
2010 French television series endings
French children's animated comedy television series
France Télévisions children's television series
France Télévisions television comedy